Keith H. Wofford (born January 25, 1969) is an American attorney. He was a candidate in the 2018 New York Attorney General Election, running on the Republican and Conservative ballot lines. He earned 35.2% of the vote, losing to then-New York City Public Advocate Letitia James, who received 62.4% of the vote.

Early life and education 
Wofford grew up in the Buffalo, New York area as one of two sons. His father, John, worked at a Chevrolet plant, and his mother, Ruby, worked two retail jobs. At 17, he attended Harvard University on a scholarship and graduated from Harvard Law School.

Career 
For many years, Wofford served as a corporate bankruptcy lawyer for the firm Ropes & Gray.

On May 22, 2018, Wofford announced that he would be seeking the Republican nomination for Attorney General of New York in 2018. He stated that addressing political corruption in state government was his top priority. Wofford was the first African-American Republican nominee for attorney general, and was considered an underdog. He campaigned on his outsider status. Leading up to the election, Letitia James was heavily favored to win. Wofford was endorsed by U.S. Representative Pete King, The Buffalo News, The Citizen, The Daily Gazette, Jewish Voice, New York Post, The Post Star, and Watertown Daily Times.

Wofford received 2,108,600 votes, finishing behind James, who earned 3,739,239 votes, and ahead of candidates from the Green, Libertarian, and Reform parties.

On October 13, 2020, Wofford was elected to the board of trustees for the New-York Historical Society.

In late 2020, Wofford was hired by the law firm White & Case.

Personal life 
Keith and his wife, Marla, have two children.

Electoral History

References 

1969 births
21st-century American politicians
Harvard College alumni
Harvard Law School alumni
Living people
New York (state) Republicans